Edward Barnard may refer to:

Edward Barnard (provost) (1717–1781), provost of Eton
Edward Emerson Barnard (1857–1923), American astronomer
Edward Barnard (politician) (c. 1806–1885), Canadian politician
Edward George Barnard (died 1851), British Liberal Party politician, Member of Parliament for Greenwich 1832–1851
Edward William Barnard (1791–1828), British scholar
 Edward Chester Barnard (1863–1921), American topographer

See also
Édouard-André Barnard (1835–1898), Lower Canada born militia officer